Albert Johnson may refer to:

Politics
Albert Johnson (congressman) (1869–1957), U.S. Representative from Washington
Albert Johnson (Mississippi politician), state legislator from Mississippi
Albert Johnson (New Mexico politician) (died 1984), mayor of Las Cruces, New Mexico
Albert W. Johnson (1906–1998), U.S. Representative from Pennsylvania

Sports
Albert Johnson (hammer thrower) (1880–1963), American track and field athlete who competed in the 1904 Summer Olympics
Albert Johnson (soccer) (1880–1941), Canadian football (soccer) player who competed in the 1904 Olympic Games
Albert Johnson (jockey) (1900–1966), American Hall of Fame jockey
Albert Ariel Bedwin Johnson (1914–1996), English real tennis player
Albert Johnson (rugby league, born 1918) (1918–1998), for Great Britain, England, and Warrington
Albert Johnson (footballer, born 1920) (1920–2011), English professional footballer
Albert Johnson (footballer, born 1923) (1923–1989), English professional footballer
Albert Johnson (racewalker) (1931–2011), British athlete at the 1956 and 1960 Summer Olympics
Albert Johnson (gridiron football) (born 1977), American CFL and NFL football player
Arthur Johnson (rugby league) (incorrectly cited "Albert Johnson"), English rugby league footballer of the 1900s, 1910s, and 1920s

Other
Albert Tilford Johnson (1851–1916), banker in Peoria, Illinois
Albert Mussey Johnson (1872–1948), millionaire who befriended Death Valley Scotty and built Scotty's Castle
Albert Williams Johnson (1872–1957), United States federal judge
Albert Wesley Johnson (1923–2010), president of the Canadian Broadcasting Corporation
Albert Johnson (criminal) (died 1932), Canadian criminal known as the "Mad Trapper of Rat River"
Prodigy (rapper), stage name of Albert Johnson (1974–2017), American rapper, one half of the duo Mobb Deep

See also
Al Johnson (disambiguation)
Bert Johnson (disambiguation)
Albert Johnston (disambiguation)